Bussière is a surname. It may also refer to the following communes in France:

 Bussière-Badil, in the Dordogne department
 Bussière-Boffy, in the Haute-Vienne department
 Bussière-Dunoise, in the Creuse department
 Bussière-Galant, in the Haute-Vienne department
 Bussière-Nouvelle, in the Creuse department
 Bussière-Poitevine, in the Haute-Vienne department
 Bussière-Saint-Georges, in the Creuse department
 La Serre-Bussière-Vieille, in the Creuse department
 Saint-Barthélemy-de-Bussière, in the Dordogne department
 Saint-Jean-la-Bussière, in the Rhône department
 Saint-Léger-sous-la-Bussière, in the Saône-et-Loire department

See also
La Bussière (disambiguation)
Bussières (disambiguation)